is a contactless smart card system used in Nagasaki, Japan. Its operators are Nagasaki Electric Tramway and six bus companies, namely, Nagasaki Bus, Nagasaki Prefectural Bus, Saihi Bus, Saikai Kōtsū, Sasebo Municipal Bus, and Shimatetsu Bus. The system uses Sony FeliCa technology, the same as that used in the Octopus card in Hong Kong, EZ-Link in Singapore and Suica on JR East.

The system was introduced on January 21, 2002. As of December 2005, 320,000 cards are issued. The card was initially used for bus lines only. Tram lines of Nagasaki Electric Tramway introduced the card from March 20, 2008.

Types of cards
Nagasaki Smart Card (commuter pass)
Nagasaki Smart Card (coupon ticket): As a smart card, this "coupon ticket" is rechargeable.
Half-price discount card: for small children and handicapped customers.
Mobile Nagasaki Smart Card: Osaifu-Keitai mobile payment service, with Mobile FeliCa technology.

External links
  Official website by Nagasaki Electric Tramway
  Official website by Nagasaki Prefectural Bus
  Official website by Nagasaki Bus
  Official website by Shimatetsu Bus
  Official website by Saihi Bus

Fare collection systems in Japan
Contactless smart cards
2002 establishments in Japan